American Conference is one of the three conferences of the CIF Northern Section, a high school athletics governing body part of the California Interscholastic Federation. The conference is divided into several leagues.

Members

Leagues 
 5 Star League
 Feather River League (soccer only)
 Mid-Valley League
 Mountain Valley League
 Sacramento Valley League
 Shasta-Cascade League

References

CIF Northern section